Fine Young Cannibals  is the debut studio album released in 1985 by the band of the same name. The album features the UK #8 debut hit single "Johnny Come Home".

This success did not continue with the next single, "Blue", which languished at #41 in the UK. The version of "Blue" on the original U.S. and Canadian vinyl LP and cassette was re-mixed and edited in an attempt to boost its commercial appeal. The re-mix version features additional electronically processed percussion overdubs, giving it a sound more typical of 1980s synthpop hits. Currently available CDs feature the re-mix version of "Blue" in place of the original U.S. album version.

The album's cover art came in two variations. The original U.S and Canadian releases on I.R.S. Records had a blue-tinted cover; most other versions, such as the U.K. release on London Records, have artwork tinted in red.

Critical reception

Sounds writer Carole Linfield gave it a four and a half out of five rating. Stewart Mason, in an AllMusic retrospective review, commented that the album "is a powerful and satisfying debut".

Track listing
Songs composed by Roland Gift and David Steele except where noted.
 "Johnny Come Home" - 3:35
 "Couldn't Care More" - 3:30
 "Don't Ask Me to Choose" (Andy Cox, Gift, Steele) - 3:05
 "Funny How Love Is" (Cox, Gift, Steele) - 3:28
 "Suspicious Minds" (Mark James) - 3:56
 "Blue" (Cox, Gift, Steele) - 3:31
 "Move to Work" - 3:26
 "On a Promise" - 3:06
 "Time Isn't Kind" (Cox, Gift, Steele) - 3:12
 "Like a Stranger" - 3:28

 Additional tracks on 1986 edition
 "Johnny Come Home" (Extended mix) - 5:43
 "Suspicious Minds" (Suspicious mix) (Mark James) - 7:52

Personnel
Fine Young Cannibals
Roland Gift – vocals
Andy Cox – guitar, organ on "Time Isn't Kind"
David Steele – bass, piano, keyboards
Additional musicians
Martin Parry – drums
Graeme Hamilton – trumpet, piano solo on "Time Isn't Kind"
Gavyn Wright – violin
Saxa – saxophone on "Funny How Love Is"
Beverlei Brown, Gloria Brown, Maxine Brown – backing vocals on "Like a Stranger"
Jimmy Somerville – backing vocals on "Suspicious Minds"
Jenny Jones – drums, backing vocals on "Couldn't Care More"
Technical
Alvin Clark – engineer
Mike Pela, Robin Millar - mixing
Anton Corbijn – front cover photography

Charts

Year-end charts

References

 

1985 debut albums
Fine Young Cannibals albums
I.R.S. Records albums
Albums produced by Robin Millar